Hamilton Frederick Bohannon (March 7, 1942 – April 24, 2020), often credited and known professionally simply as Bohannon, was an American percussionist, band leader, songwriter, arranger, and record producer, who was one of the leading figures in 1970s disco music.

Life and career
He was born in Newnan, Georgia, and learned the drums at school. He began playing in local bands, one of which featured guitarist Jimi Hendrix, before graduating from Clark College with a degree in music and secondary education. After a brief period as a schoolteacher, he was recruited in 1964 as drummer in 13-year-old Stevie Wonder's touring band. He moved to Detroit in 1967, where he was employed by Motown as the leader and arranger of Bohannon & The Motown Sound, who provided backing for many of the label's top acts on tour, including Stevie Wonder, Smokey Robinson, Marvin Gaye, the Temptations, Diana Ross and the Supremes, the Four Tops and others.

When Motown moved from Detroit to Los Angeles, Bohannon stayed behind to form his own ensemble, featuring members of local band The Fabulous Counts and including such musicians as Ray Parker Jr. and Dennis Coffey. He signed in 1972 with the Dakar label run by producer Carl Davis, and released his debut album Stop & Go in early 1973. This was followed by five more albums for the label over the next two years, on which he "perfected his formula of heavy, thudding bass accents and aggressive rhythms". Although several of his tracks were club hits, he had limited chart success. His first hit single, in 1974, was "South African Man", which reached no. 78 on the Billboard R&B chart, but had more success in the UK, where it reached no. 22 on the UK Singles Chart. This was followed up in 1975 by "Foot Stompin Music" – his only record to reach the US Billboard Hot 100 – and "Disco Stomp", his biggest hit in the UK where it reached no. 6.

In 1976, Bohannon signed with Mercury Records and two years later had one of his biggest successes with "Let’s Start the Dance," which reached no. 9 on the R&B chart and no. 7 on the disco chart. "Let's Start the Dance" featured singer Carolyn Crawford, whose subsequent albums Bohannon went on to produce. In 1981, a new mix of "Let's Start the Dance" was successful on the dance chart. In 1980, he established Phase II Records, and continued to have minor hits on the R&B chart for the next three years, using new vocalists Liz Lands and Altrinna Grayson. He signed with MCA Records in 1984 and released several more albums. His last album, It's Time to Jam, was issued on the South Bound label in 1990.

Much of his music has been widely sampled, most notably on Chicago DJ/producer Paul Johnson's 1999 hit "Get Get Down" which heavily sampled Bohannon's "Me and the Gang." Other musicians who have used samples of his music include Jay Z, Digable Planets, and Snoop Dogg. His name was also repeatedly invoked in the Tom Tom Club song "Genius of Love." His composition "Ooh!" was included on Mary J. Blige's album Love & Life in 2003.

In later years Bohannon produced a new singer, Governor, on Atlantic Records, as well as working on material with his son, Hamilton Bohannon II, and publishing an audiobook memoir of his early years in the music business, Bohannon Speaks from the Beginning.

Bohannon was a devout Christian and dedicated his album Dance Your Ass Off to "God, my master, savior and Jesus Christ". The album also included a disclaimer that "Dance Your Ass Off is not used in the sense of profanity."

In 2017, Peachtree Street in Newnan was renamed Bohannon Drive by the city council in his honor.

He died on April 24, 2020, at his home in Atlanta at the age of 78.

Discography

Studio albums

Compilation albums

Alternate name album releases

Singles

References

External links
 

1942 births
2020 deaths
20th-century African-American male singers
American Christians
Atlantic Records artists
MCA Records artists
Mercury Records artists
Songwriters from Georgia (U.S. state)
Record producers from Georgia (U.S. state)
People from Newnan, Georgia
African-American songwriters
American male songwriters